Charles M. Russell High School (also known as CMR) is a public high school in Great Falls, Montana, in the United States. It is part of the Great Falls Public Schools system. It is one of two public high schools in the city, the other being Great Falls High School. The school opened on September 7, 1965, with about 1,400 students. The school had about 1,515 students enrolled in the 2011–2012 school year.  CMR was opened in 1965 and the Rustlers have won 13 Montana state AA football championships, the most of any school in that time period.

Notable alumni
Among its notable alumni are:
Scyller Borglum, member of the South Dakota House of Representatives
Dave Dickenson, University of Montana-Missoula and Canadian Football League player
Patrick Dwyer, professional hockey player with the Carolina Hurricanes
Todd Foster, Olympic boxer
Tyler Graham, San Francisco Giants and Arizona Diamondbacks professional baseball outfielder
Melony G. Griffith, member of the Maryland House of Delegates
Josh Huestis, Oklahoma City Thunder basketball player
Ryan Leaf, former NFL quarterback
 Trevor Funseth, Barstool Sports College Gaming Championship National Champion

References

External links
 CMR High School web site

Public high schools in Montana
Buildings and structures in Great Falls, Montana
Schools in Cascade County, Montana
Educational institutions established in 1965
1965 establishments in Montana